Tetyana Nesterova (born May 12, 1969) is a Ukrainian sport shooter. She competed at the 1996 Summer Olympics in the women's 50 metre rifle three positions event, in which she placed eighth, and the women's 10 metre air rifle event, in which she tied for 29th place.

References

1969 births
Living people
ISSF rifle shooters
Ukrainian female sport shooters
Shooters at the 1996 Summer Olympics
Olympic shooters of Ukraine
20th-century Ukrainian women